Boon Keng MRT station is an underground Mass Rapid Transit (MRT) station on the North East line in Kallang, Singapore. Boon Keng Station  also serves the nearby schools such as Northlight Hong wen And Towner Road primary schools

Located underneath Serangoon Road just after the traffic junction with Towner Road and Boon Keng Road, Boon Keng station is within a ten-minute walk to Bendemeer MRT station on the Downtown line. The station was named after Lim Boon Keng, a Chinese physician who promoted health and educational reforms in Singapore.

History
The North East line (NEL) Contract 705 for the design and construction of Potong Pasir and Boon Keng stations and associated tunnels was awarded to the joint venture of Kumagai Gumi, Sembawang Engineering & Construction and Mitsui & Corporation on 23 June 1997 for $316.7 million. To facilitate the construction of the station, a part of Bendemeer Shopping Mall was demolished to make way for the construction of this station. The remaining portion of the building continues to be used for retail purposes today.

Art in Transit
Art in Transit at this station (Metamorphosis by Lim Poh Teck) features a bright tropical-themed painting on the concourse level, consisting of icons of everyday life used in the past and present.

References

Railway stations in Singapore opened in 2003
Kallang
Mass Rapid Transit (Singapore) stations